Thomas Butler, 1st Baron Cahir or Caher (died 1558) was an Irish peer.

Biography 
Butler was the son of Thomas Butler of Cahir and Catherine Power and the great-grandson of James "Gallda" Butler.

He was elevated to the peerage of Ireland, on 10 November 1543, by the title of Baron of Caher. He married Eleanor Butler, fifth daughter of Piers Butler, 8th Earl of Ormond. He lived in Cahir Castle and ruled much of the barony of Iffa and Offa West.

The Baron died in 1558 and was succeeded by his only surviving son and heir, Edmund Butler, 2nd Baron Cahir who died himself two years later. As he had no legitimate male heirs, the title became extinct. It was, however, revived in favour of his first cousin, Theobald Butler, 1st Baron Cahir (of the second creation).

See also
Butler dynasty

References

Barons in the Peerage of Ireland
Peers of Ireland created by Henry VIII
Thomas
16th-century Irish people
Year of birth uncertain
1558 deaths